Bound for Glory is a Canadian drama film, directed by Clément Perron and released in 1975.

Set against the backdrop of the 1942 Canadian conscription plebiscite, the film is set in a small town in the Beauce region of Quebec where resistance to the war is high and many men have fled into the woods to escape being conscripted. The film's cast includes Serge L'Italien, Rachel Cailhier, Jacques Thisdale, André Melançon, Yolande Roy, Jean-Marie Lemieux, Louise Ladouceur and Jean-Pierre Masson.

Melançon won the Canadian Film Award for Best Actor at the 27th Canadian Film Awards.

References

External links
Partis pour la gloire at the National Film Board of Canada

1975 films
Beauce, Quebec
1970s French-language films
Films set in Quebec
Films shot in Quebec
National Film Board of Canada films
Canadian war drama films
Films directed by Clément Perron
French-language Canadian films
Canadian World War II films
1970s Canadian films